The 1991/92 FIS Nordic Combined World Cup was the 9th world cup season, a combination of ski jumping and cross-country skiing organized by FIS. It started on 14 Dec 1991 in Štrbské Pleso, Czechoslovakia and ended on 13 March 1992 in Oslo, Norway.

Calendar

Men

Standings

Overall 

Standings after 8 events.

Nations Cup 

Standings after 8 events.

References

External links
FIS Nordic Combined World Cup 1991/92 

1991 in Nordic combined
1992 in Nordic combined
FIS Nordic Combined World Cup